Andrés Cepeda Cediel (born July 7, 1973) is a popular Colombian singer-songwriter. He was born in Bogotá, the youngest of five children. He displayed an inclination towards music from an early age, studying piano since the age of 5. He composed his first piece at the age of 12. He studied at Colegio San Carlos and later at Colegio Emilio Valenzuela. His musical career began as the lead voice of Poligamia, a latin rock-pop group which he founded with some friends during his adolescence.
After Poligamia was disbanded, Cepeda continued with his musical career as a soloist, finding success in different musical genres such as bolero and Balada, among other romantic genres. His album El carpintero achieved quadruple-platinum sales in Colombia.

Discography

With Poligamia
 Una Canción (1993)
 Vueltas y Vueltas (1995)
 Promotal 500 mg (1996)
 Buenas Gracias, Muchas Noches (1998) – Farewell Concert

Solo Work

Albums
 Sé Morir (1999)

 El Carpintero (2001)

 Siempre Queda Una Canción (2002)

 Canción Rota (2003)

 Para Amarte Mejor (2006)

 Pop Latino (2007)
Día Tras Día (2009)
 Lo Mejor Que Hay En Mi Vida (2012)
 Mil Ciudades (2015)

Filmography
 La Voz Colombia (Coach), 2012
 La Voz Colombia (Coach), 2013
 La Voz Colombia (Coach), 2014

Awards and nominations

Latin Grammy Awards
A Latin Grammy Award is an accolade by the Latin Academy of Recording Arts & Sciences to recognize outstanding achievement in the music industry. Andres Cepeda has received one award from eight nominations.

|-
| 2007 || Para Amarte Mejor || Best Male Pop Vocal Album || 
|-
| style="text-align:center;" rowspan="3"|2009 || Día tras día || Album of the Year || 
|-
|Día tras día || Song of the Year || 
|-
|Día tras día || Best Male Pop Vocal Album || 
|-
|-
| style="text-align:center;" rowspan="4"|2013 || Lo Mejor Que Hay En Mi Vida || Album of the Year || 
|-
|Lo Mejor Que Hay En Mi Vida || Song of the Year || 
|-
|Lo Mejor Que Hay En Mi Vida || Record of the Year || 
|-
|Lo Mejor Que Hay En Mi Vida || Best Traditional Pop Vocal Album || 
|-

Premios 40 Principales
Premios 40 Principales is an awards ceremony hosted annually by the Spanish radio channel Los 40 Principales.

|-
| 2007
| rowspan="2"|Andrés Cepeda
| rowspan="2"|Best Colombian Act
|
|-
| 2009
|
|-

Premios TVyNovelas

|-
| 2014
| Andrés Cepeda By La Voz Colombia 2
| Best Jury
|
|-

References

Colombian songwriters
Male songwriters
1973 births
Living people
Singers from Bogotá
21st-century Colombian male singers
Colombian rock singers
Sony Music Colombia artists
Latin Grammy Award winners
20th-century Colombian male singers